Real Stories Of The Highway Patrol is a half-hour syndicated television series which ran in the United States for six seasons from March 22, 1993 to June 29, 1998, Started in the UK, it's produced by Mark Massari Productions and ITV2 on 2004-2009, Granada and VCI, later 2 Entertain in VHS and DVD releases, and STV Productions in 2010-2016. series 1 premiered on November 15, 2004, series 2 premiered on September 8, 2008, series 3 premiered on January 11, 2010, series 4 premiered in January 14, 2013, series 5 premiered in February 9, 2015 and series 6 premiered in May 30, 2016. for a total of 780 episodes, capitalizing on the success of "real-life" police series such as Cops. Production companies were Mark Massari Productions, and Leap Off Productions, and was distributed by Genesis Entertainment, New World International, and later New World/Genesis Distribution. The show described as Cops meets America's Most Wanted.

Format
The series revolved around the stories of highway patrol officers and state police from across the country, who would give commentary on a particularly difficult (or sometimes, comedic) arrest they made. At times, the officer's work caused them grievous injury and a subsequent commendation from their department. Each crime and subsequent arrest was adapted for the viewing audiences, though some segments were shot in a traditional multiple-camera setup, rather than emulating the single-camera cinéma vérité style of COPS.

The series was hosted by Maury Hannigan, who at the time was Commissioner of the California Highway Patrol.

UK

In popular culture
The show was spoofed in a segment of the 2000 movie The Adventures of Rocky and Bullwinkle.
A similarity of the show was a segment featured in the Beavis and Butt-Head episode "Dream On" called True Stories of the Highway Patrol.
In 1994, Saturday Night Live parodied the show as Real Stories of the Arkansas Highway Patrol, and featured John Goodman.
In the first episode of King of the Hill, a character claims that her mother's arrest was filmed on Real Stories of the Highway Patrol.
In 1998, Ben Stiller parodied Real Stories of the Highway Patrol on Saturday Night Live. Darrell Hammond portrayed host Maury Hannigan when he sported a mustache.
In the 1998 Leslie Nielsen comedy Wrongfully Accused, host Hannigan appears in a cameo (along with America's Most Wanted host John Walsh) in which he asks Nielsen's character Ryan Harrison, who's trying to make a getaway, if he has any "Real Stories" he'd like to tell.

See also
World's Wildest Police Videos

References

External links
 
Real Stories of the Highway Patrol show on aol.com

1990s American crime television series
English-language television shows
First-run syndicated television programs in the United States
Television series by 20th Century Fox Television
Television series by New World Television
1993 American television series debuts
1999 American television series endings
Television series featuring reenactments